The 2015 European Curling Championships were held from November 20 to 28 in Esbjerg, Denmark. Denmark last hosted the European Curling Championships in 1996 in Copenhagen. The Group C competitions were held during October in Champéry, Switzerland.

At the conclusion of the championships, the top eight women's teams went to the 2016 Ford World Women's Curling Championship in Swift Current, and the top seven men's teams to the 2016 World Men's Curling Championship in Basel.

Men

Group A
The Group A competitions were contested at the Granly Hockey Arena in Esbjerg.

Round-robin standings

Final round-robin standings

Playoffs

Bronze-medal game
Friday, November 27, 19:00

Gold-medal game
Saturday, November 27, 10:00

Group B
The Group B competitions will be contested at the Esbjerg Curling Club in Esbjerg.

Round Robin standings

Relegation round

Playoffs

Bronze-medal game
Friday, November 27, 13:30

Gold-medal game
Friday, November 27, 13:30

Group C
The Group C competitions will be contested at the Palladium de Champéry in Champéry.

Round Robin standings
Final round-robin standings

Playoffs

Women

Group A
The Group A competitions were contested at the Granly Hockey Arena in Esbjerg.

Round-robin standings

Final round-robin standings

Playoffs

Bronze-medal game
Friday, November 27, 19:00

Gold-medal game
Saturday, November 28, 15:00

Group B
The Group B competitions were contested at the Esbjerg Curling Club in Esbjerg.

Round-robin standings

Final round-robin standings

Playoffs

Bronze-medal game
Friday, November 27, 13:30

Gold-medal game
Friday, November 27, 13:30

Group C
The Group C competitions were contested at the Palladium de Champéry in Champéry.

Round-robin standings
Final round-robin standings

Playoffs

References
General

Specific

2015 in curling
European Curling Championships
2015 in Danish sport
Sport in Esbjerg
November 2015 sports events in Europe
International curling competitions hosted by Denmark